The Bay is a 2012 American mockumentary horror film directed by Barry Levinson and written by Michael Wallach. It stars Kether Donohue, Nansi Aluka, Christopher Denham, Frank Deal, and Kristen Connolly and premiered at the 2012 Toronto International Film Festival. It was released in theaters on November 2, 2012.

Plot
The opening text explains the footage shown in the film was confiscated by the U.S. government until an anonymous source leaked it for the entire world to see.

Claridge, a town located on Maryland's Eastern Shore, thrives on its water supply. However, the nearby chicken farm has come under fire for polluting the Chesapeake Bay due to the dumping of chicken excrement and other toxins into the water. As rookie reporter Donna Thompson covers a local Fourth of July celebration, dozens of citizens fall violently ill and exhibit severe lesions. Dr. Jack Abrams, the head of the Atlantic Hospital, is overwhelmed with patients and contacts the Centers for Disease Control, who initially believe the issue to be caused by a viral outbreak. The town descends into chaos as people begin dying en masse within hours. Several citizens, including a teenager named Jennifer, use FaceTime to report bizarre symptoms, including the feeling of bugs in their bodies.

Months beforehand, two oceanographers discovered high toxicity levels in the bay. After encountering multiple eviscerated fish eaten from the inside out, they realized that the true culprit was massive, mutated tongue-eating lice. The isopods have evolved to affect humans due to the high volume of chicken excrement dumped into the bay, the chickens having been fed steroids to promote rapid growth. Because of this, the isopods proliferate at a massive rate, killing off millions of fish and causing 40% of the bay to become lifeless. The lesions are the result of the isopods eating their hosts from the inside out. The oceanographers attempted to alert city authorities, but the mayor, John Stockman, ignored the warnings. The oceanographers were eventually killed by a swarm of fully-grown isopods, and their bodies are discovered shortly before the film's events.

The Talmet family sail to Claridge, unaware of the danger as the town has been forcibly quarantined and local law enforcement has shut down cell towers. Unbeknownst to the family, wife Stephanie's parents have been affected by the isopods. Meanwhile, two deputies, Jimson and Paul answer a call concerning someone screaming in pain; in a digitally enhanced audio recording, Jimson encounters an infected family begging to be killed. Having gone insane from seeing what has happened, he euthanizes them and subsequently murders Paul after one of the isopods bites him. After being confronted by Stockman and Sheriff Lee Roberts, the lesion-covered Jimson kills Roberts and himself. Stockman attempts to flee in Roberts' police car, only to be killed in a car accident.

The CDC eventually learns that the water in Claridge likely has a considerable radioactive rating, which had gone unreported. Upon learning about the mutated isopods, the CDC contacts the White House. Dr. Abrams is told that no additional help is forthcoming and that he and the staff should evacuate. Abrams reveals that he is the sole surviving staff member at the hospital, but refuses to leave. Upon realizing that he too is now infected, he uses his final hours to document the mass of dead bodies within the hospital, among whom is Jennifer. Meanwhile, the CDC contacts the Department of Homeland Security, who reveal that they themselves had received the report about the oceanographers but did not report it immediately due to not wanting to cause undue panic; they write off the chaos as happening in a "small town" and refuse to offer help. 

Donna and her cameraman, Jim Hoyt, continue to document the carnage despite her station's blog being shut down by the FBI. Donna, in narration, reveals that after fleeing Claridge she never reported anything else and that Jim later died. The Talmets arrive to find the town mostly deserted, with corpses littering the street. Horrified, they manage to contact a friend Bill on Skype to ask for help. However, Alex, who swam in the bay earlier, realizes he has lesions on his neck when Bill points them out. He quickly dies from isopods crawling out of his neck, while Stephanie is able to escape unharmed with infant son Andrew. They are frightened by a still-living woman hiding in a police car who begs for help before Stephanie hits her, accidentally snapping her neck.

Years later, Donna leaks the gathered footage, revealing that the government managed to kill the isopods by filling the water with chlorine; they then covered up the incident as the result of "unusually high water temperatures" and paid off the few survivors (including Donna) in exchange for silence. She then reveals that Stephanie is still living but refused to participate in the film. The movie ends with shots of civilians innocently enjoying the water of the bay, unaware of the dangers, as 40% of the bay remains lifeless.

Cast
 Kether Donohue as Donna Thompson
 Kristen Connolly as Stephanie
 Will Rogers as Alex
 Stephen Kunken as Dr. Jack Abrams
 Robert Treveiler as Dr. Williams
 Nansi Aluka as Jaqueline
 Christopher Denham as Sam
 Frank Deal as Mayor John Stockman
 Michael Beasley as Deputy Jimson
 Jody Thompson as Deputy Paul
 Andrew Stahl as Sheriff Lee Roberts
 Jane McNeill as Victim #1

Production
The film came about as a result of a documentary Levinson was asked to produce about problems facing the Chesapeake Bay. Although Levinson chose to abandon the documentary upon learning that Frontline already covered the same issue, Levinson instead decided to use the research to produce a horror film which he hoped would shed light on the issues facing Chesapeake. As such when promoting the film he noted that it's "80 percent factual information."

According to script writer Michael Wallach, the script originally started out as a short story about a young couple who comes across a dead town. After having pieced together what happened from footage scattered across town, they realize the town had not fully died yet. Barry was happy with the script, and sent Wallach the movie JFK: 3 Shots That Changed America and asked if the movie could be made into a documentary.

Levinson chose to use the found footage format after thinking about the Pompeii disaster and noting that if such a disaster happened today there would be much more evidence of what happened with him telling Yahoo! "For the very first time in history, you can get a picture of that town, if you collect all the footage from everyone's cell phones and their digital cameras and the Skypes, and the texting and everything else" A byproduct of the format was that much of the footage was able to be shot by the actors themselves as opposed to a more traditional camera crew. According to Levinson roughly one third of the film was shot this way.

Though the film is set in Levinson's home state of Maryland, it was shot on locations in North Carolina and South Carolina.

Reception
The film has received mostly positive reviews from critics, with a 76% "certified fresh" approval rating and an average rating of 6.6 out of 10 on review aggregator Rotten Tomatoes, based on 82 reviews. The website's critical consensus states that "Barry Levinson's eco-horror flick cleverly utilizes familiar found-footage methods in service of a gruesome yet atmospheric chiller." It also holds a score of 65 out of 100 on Metacritic, based on 20 reviewers, indicating "generally favorable reviews". David Cox of The Guardian awarded the film 5 out of 5 stars and called it a "horror film for grown ups". Roger Ebert of the Chicago Sun-Times, however, was less positive, awarding the film 2.5 out of a possible 4, stating "Although there are some scary moments here, and a lot of gruesome ones, this isn't a horror film so much as a faux eco-documentary".

References

External links
 
 

2010s American films
2010s English-language films
2012 films
2012 horror films
2012 horror thriller films
2012 independent films
American horror thriller films
American independent films
American natural horror films
Blumhouse Productions films
Camcorder films
Eastern Shore of Maryland in fiction
Films directed by Barry Levinson
Films produced by Jason Blum
Films scored by Marcelo Zarvos
Films set in 2009
Films set in Maryland
Found footage films
Holiday horror films
Independence Day (United States) films
Lionsgate films
Roadside Attractions films
Works about Chesapeake Bay